Bernadett Heidum (born 26 May 1988) is a Hungarian short track speed skater.

External links
sports-reference

1988 births
Living people
Hungarian female short track speed skaters
Olympic short track speed skaters of Hungary
Short track speed skaters at the 2010 Winter Olympics
Short track speed skaters at the 2014 Winter Olympics
Short track speed skaters at the 2018 Winter Olympics
Speed skaters from Budapest
Universiade medalists in short track speed skating
World Short Track Speed Skating Championships medalists
Universiade silver medalists for Hungary
Universiade bronze medalists for Hungary
Competitors at the 2011 Winter Universiade
Competitors at the 2013 Winter Universiade
21st-century Hungarian women